The 2019 Kwara State gubernatorial election occurred on March 9, 2019. APC's AbdulRahman AbdulRazaq polled 73.12% of the total votes, ahead of PDP's Razak Atunwa who got 25.31% of votes trailing behind by a margin of 216,792 votes, and several minor party candidates. APC won in all 16 LGAs of the state.

AbdulRahman AbdulRazaq from Kwara Central senatorial district emerged winner at the gubernatorial primary after defeating Yammah Abdullahi. His running mate is Kayode Alabi from Kwara South senatorial district.

Of the 35 candidates who aspired for the governorship seat, 33 were male, two were female (although there were initially three females).

Electoral system
The Governor of Kwara State is elected using the plurality voting system.

Primary election

PDP primary
The PDP primary election was held 30 September 2018. There were about 2,227 accredited delegate voters present from 193 wards across the 16 LGAs of the state. Razak Atunwa emerged winner with 1,555 votes defeating closest rival, Mohammed Shaaba Lafiagi who polled 578 votes. In the course of the contest, eight out of 10 aspirants stepped down, leaving just: Hon. Razak Atunwa and Senator Mohammed Shaaba Lafiagi, both lawmakers. Those who withdrew include: Mal. Bolaji Abdullahi, Prof. Suleiman Abubakar, Alh. Mohammed Ajia, Dr. Ali Ahmad, Hon. Haman Patigi, Alh. Ladi Hassan, Hon. Zakari Mohammed and Alhaji Saka Isau (SAN). The exercise was partly disrupted by thugs.

Candidates
Party nominee: Razak Atunwa: Winner.
Running mate: Gbenga Makanjuola.
 Mohammed Shaaba Lafiagi
 Bolaji Abdullahi (withdrew)
 Suleiman Abubakar (withdrew)
 Mohammed Ajia (withdrew)
 Ali Ahmad (withdrew)
 Haman Patigi (withdrew)
 Ladi Hassan (withdrew)
 Zakari Mohammed (withdrew)
 Saka Isau (withdrew)

APC primary
The APC primary elections in Kwara State was held via direct primaries between Saturday 5 and Sunday 6 October 2018. It was initially put on hold. AbdulRahman AbdulRazaq emerged the winner having polled 29,098 votes to defeat his closest opponent, Yammah Abdullahi with 22,116 votes and 23 other contestants as the party was reported to have officially handed out the names of 25 governorship candidates. Amongst which are Alh. Lukman Mustapha 14,233 votes, Prof. Oba AbdulRaheem 23,298; Alh. Hakeem Lawal 18,758 votes, Alh. Mooshood Murtala 9,511 votes, Isaq Modibbo Kawu 5,060 votes, Alh. Yakubu Gobir 2,420 votes, and Tajudeen Makama Audu 3,127 votes. Mohammed Belgore (SAN) and Alh. Yahaya Seriki stepped down in support of AbdulRasaq, while Saliu Mustapha and Mashood Mustapha were disqualified. The election was later in May 2019 nullified by the court.

Candidates
Party nominee: AbdulRahman AbdulRazaq: Winner: 29,098 votes.
Running mate: Kayode Alabi.
 Yammah Abdullahi: 22,116 votes 
 Lukman Mustapha: 14,233 votes (withdrew)
 Oba AbdulRaheem: 23,298 votes
 Hakeem Lawal: 18,758 votes (withdrew)
 Mooshood Murtala: 9,511 votes
 Ishaq Modibbo Kawu: 5,060 votes (withdrew)
 Yakubu Gobir: 2,420 votes (withdrew)
 Tajudeen Makama Audu: 3,127 votes
 Shuaib Abdulraheem (withdrew)
 Shuaib Yarman (withdrew)
 Tajudeen Laifiaji (withdrew)
 Mohammed Dele Belgore (withdrew)
 Yahaya Seriki (withdrew)
 Saliu Mustapha (not cleared)
 Mashood Mustapha (not cleared)

Results
A total of 35 candidates registered with the Independent National Electoral Commission to contest in the election. APC governorship aspirant, AbdulRahman AbdulRazaq, won election polling 331,546 votes, defeating PDP's Razak Atunwa who came second with 114,754 votes, and several minority party candidates, with an early lead.

The total number of registered voters in Kwara State was 1,376,372 while 464,393 voters were accredited. Total number of votes cast was 463,427, while total number of valid votes was 453,433. Total rejected votes were 9,994.

By local government area
Here are the results of the election from the local government areas of the state for the two major parties. The total valid votes of 453,433 represents the 35 political parties that participated in the election. Blue represents LGAs won by AbdulRazaq. Green represents LGAs won by Atunwa.

References 

Gubernatorial election 2019
Kwara State gubernatorial election
Kwara State gubernatorial election
Kwara State gubernatorial elections
2019 Kwara State elections